A family reunion takes place on a specified day each year for the purpose of keeping an extended family closer together.

Family Reunion may also refer to:

Music 
 Family Reunion (band), a country music band
 Chapter II: Family Reunion, the second album of Mo Thugs
 Family Reunion (album), a 1975 album by The O'Jays, or the title song
 "Family Reunion" (Saliva song), 2008
 "Family Reunion" (Blink-182 song), 1999
 "Family Reunion", a song by Corb Lund from Horse Soldier! Horse Soldier!
 "Family Reunion", a song by David Allan Coe from Longhaired Redneck
 "Family Reunion", a song by George Benson an Songs and Stories

Other 
 Family Re-Union, an annual family policy conference in the United States
 Family Reunion (film), a 1981 American two-part drama television film starring Bette Davis
 The Family Reunion (painting), an 1867 painting by Frédéric Bazille
 Family Reunion (TV series), a 2019 American television series released on Netflix
 "Family Reunion" (Rugrats), an episode of the Nicktoons show Rugrats
 The Family Reunion, a 1939 play by T. S. Eliot
 Family reunification, immigration reason

See also
 Family (disambiguation)
 Reunion (disambiguation)